Potash Charles Matathia (born 1979) is a scriptwriter from Nairobi, Kenya who is majorly known for writing the script of Nairobi Half Life (2012) which was one of the best selling movies in Kenya.

References

External links 

1985 births
Living people
Male film score composers
Kenyan film directors
Kenyan screenwriters
People from Nairobi
Kenyan musicians